The 2009 FIBA Under-19 World Championship for Women (Thai: บาสเกตบอลหญิงชิงแชมป์โลกรุ่นอายุไม่เกิน 19 ปี 2009) was hosted by Thailand from July 23 until August 2, 2009. Teams played a round robin schedule, with the top four teams of the eighth-final four advancing to the knockout stage.

Overview
The United States won their fourth title. The other medalists in the tournament were Spain (silver) and Argentina (bronze). Spain's Marta Xargay was chosen as the tournaments MVP with an average of 15.4 PPG. Australia also had a strong tournament led by Elizabeth Cambage and had a solid 8-1 record at the end of the tournament. Unfortunately they dropped the one match by one point to Canada in the Quarter-Finals. Eventually they finished 5th.

In the Gold Medal Game, the United States defeated Spain 87-71 despite losing the previous time they met at the tournament 86-90. In the Bronze Medal Match Argentina slipped a victory against the Canadians 58-51.

The host nation Thailand suffered in the tournament despite the home crowd finishing 16th in the 16 team tournament. They finished with a final record of 0-5.

Venues
The tournament was played in one venue. It was held at the Thai-Japanese bangkok Youth Center. The center had two arenas.

Competing nations

FIBA Africa (2)
 
 
FIBA Asia (4)
 
 
 
  (Host Nation)

FIBA Americas (4)
 
 
 
 
FIBA Oceania (1)
 

FIBA Europe (5)

Groups

Preliminary  Round

Group A

Group B

Group C

Group D

Eighth-final round

Group E

Group F

Knockout stage

Bracket

5th place bracket

9th place bracket

13th place bracket

Quarterfinals

Classification 13–16

Classification 9–12

Classification 5–8

Semifinals

Fifteenth place game

Thirteenth place game

Eleventh place game

Ninth place game

Seventh place game

Fifth place game

Third place game

Final

Final standings

Awards

All-Tournament Team
  Marina Solopova
  Elizabeth Cambage
  Nnemkadi Ogwumike
  Marta Xargay
  Cristina Ouviña

References

External links 
 FIBA Under-19 World Championship for Women 2009

2009
2009 in women's basketball
International women's basketball competitions hosted by Thailand
2009–10 in Thai basketball
2009 in youth sport